Mincho Yovchev (27 February 1942 – 5 December 2020) was a Bulgarian politician who served as Minister of Industry and Deputy Prime Minister.

References

1942 births
2020 deaths
Bulgarian politicians